Coonalpyn  is a town and a locality in the Australian state of South Australia located about  south-east of the state capital of Adelaide and about  south-east of the municipal seat in Tailem Bend.  It is situated in the local government area of the Coorong District Council and is in the State electoratal district of MacKillop and the Federal division of Barker.

At the 2016 census, the locality had a population of 353 of which 195 lived in its town centre.

Origin of the name

This town's name is derived from the Aboriginal word Coonalpyn, meaning Barren Woman. Coonalpyn Downs was chosen by John Barton Hack to name the property and the railway station within this property.

History

The town of Coonalpyn was proclaimed on 25 November 1909.

In 1927, the Congregational Church in Coonalpyn erected its church building, and is now the Coonalpyn Uniting Church.

Coonalpyn was originally known as part of the Ninety Mile Desert, until in approximately 1949 when the land was developed by the AMP Society.

The town became the seat for the District Council of Coonalpyn Downs which was established on 30 May 1957.

Electricity came to Coonalpyn through ETSA in 1962 and the Tailem Bend–Keith pipeline was constructed in 1968.

In 1997, the District Council of Coonalpyn Downs amalgamated with the Peake District Council and Meningie District Council to form The Coorong District Council.

Boundaries for the locality of Coonalpyn were created on 24 August 2000.

Lutheran History of the Area
A group of Lutheran Settlers moved to the Coonalpyn District in the early 1920s, the first congregation, Bethlehem Lutheran Congregation, being formed on 9 March 1930.  A second congregation, Immanuel Lutheran Congregation, was formed on 28 July 1940.  In 1952, the two congregations conjointly decided to erect a church and move out of the old town institute into the new Coonalpyn Lutheran Church.  The church was finished and dedicated in 1953.  When Lutheran Amalgamation occurred in 1966, the United Evangelical Lutheran Church in Australia (UELCA) & Evangelical Lutheran Church of Australia (ELCA) congregations merged to form the Redeemer Lutheran Congregation, and a new parish was formed which included congregations at Tintinara and Meningie.

Sporting Teams

In 1992, the Border-Downs Magpies and Tintinara Blues amalgamated to form the Border-Downs Tintinara Crows Football Club.  The club was then a member of the River Murray Football League, and in 2001 joined the Mallee Football League. This also includes the Crows Netball Club.

Coonalpyn also has a tennis club which belongs to the Border-Downs Tennis Association including towns such as Malinong, Culburra, Yumali, Coomandook, Tintinara & Ki Ki

There is also an active lawn bowls club which has a series of "community bowls" nights during the summer months to encourage the community to come and try lawn bowls.

Photo gallery

See also

 Tauragat Well

References

External links
 Coonalpyn, South Australia

Towns in South Australia